Hiku (also Romanized as Hīkū; also known as Hī Kūh and Hīkūh) is a village in Chashm Rural District, Shahmirzad District, Mehdishahr County, Semnan Province, Iran. At the 2006 census, its population was 62, in 29 families.

References 

Populated places in Mehdishahr County